Auratonota dominica is a species of moth of the family Tortricidae. It is endemic to Dominica.

References

Moths described in 1993
Auratonota
Moths of the Caribbean